Dmitri Eduardovich Shevchenko (born 15 December 1995) is a Kazakhstani ice hockey player for Avangard Omsk and the Kazakhstani national team.

He represented Kazakhstan at the 2021 IIHF World Championship.

References

External links

1995 births
Living people
Avangard Omsk players
Barys Nur-Sultan players
Dynamo Balashikha players
Kazakhstani ice hockey centres
People from Voskresensk